Centruroides suffusus, the Mexican scorpion, is a species of scorpion in the family Buthidae.

References

Buthidae
Articles created by Qbugbot
Animals described in 1902